Stomotheca is the term applied to the feeding apparatus in front of the mouth of harvestmen, and sometimes the related scorpions. Usually it consists of the epistome (labrum), two pairs of coxapophyses (endites, maxillary lobes) and often a labium.

The epistome is a projection that forms the anterior wall of the stomotheca. Its upper side is hardened and divided by a transverse invagination (sulcus). The part nearer the groove is sometimes called clypeus, the other one labrum. The area around the mouth is soft and flexible, often with a distal lobe. On the sides, the walls around the mouth are fused to the medial surfaces of the pedipalpal coxae, and a transverse muscle attaches to the inner surfaces of the epistomal walls.

Coxapophyses are extensions from the pedipalps and first pair of legs. While hardened at the base, they end in large soft pads that work as lips. It some species there is a narrow canal (pseudotrachea) on the posterior surface of the pedipalpal coxapophysis, possibly conducting fluids into the digestive tract. Salivary glands lead into the preoral chamber from both pairs of coxapophyses. While most harvestmen have coxapophyses on the second pair of legs as well, these do not end in pad-like structures and are reduced in many groups. Where they are fully developed, they probably aid in food intake. Similar lobular structures are sometimes found on the two latter pairs of legs as well, but their function is unknown.

The labium, when present, is a flattened plate derived from the somite of the first walking leg. While large in many Eupnoi and Dyspnoi, it is small in most Laniatores and absent in Cyphophthalmi.

The term stomotheca is derived from Ancient Greek stoma "mouth" and theca "case, box".

Footnotes

References
  (eds.) (2007): Harvestmen - The Biology of Opiliones. Harvard University Press 

Harvestmen
Arachnid anatomy